Muri Junction, station code MURI, is the railway station serving the remote town of Muri in the Ranchi district in the Indian state of Jharkhand. Muri Junction belongs to the Ranchi division of the South Eastern Railway zone of the Indian Railways.

History
The Purulia–Ranchi line was opened as a narrow-gauge railway of BNR in 1907.

In 1927, Bengal Nagpur Railway opened the  Chandil–Barkakana section to traffic.

The construction of the -long Chandrapura–Muri–Ranchi–Hatia line started in 1957 and was completed in 1961.

Further extension

Facilities 
The major facilities available are waiting rooms, retiring room, computerized reservation facility, reservation counter, vehicle parking, etc. The vehicles are allowed to enter the station premises. Security personnel from the Government Railway Police (GRP) are present for security.  A railway medical unit providing health facilities is located near Muri Junction.

Platforms
There are three platforms which are interconnected with a foot overbridge (FOB).

Trains 
Many Express and Passenger trains pass through Muri Junction. Muri also serves as terminal station for few of them. Several electrified local passenger trains also run from Ranchi to neighboring destinations on frequent intervals.
Muri is connected to major cities of India- Kolkata, New Delhi, Mumbai, Chennai, Renukoot, Surat, Guwahati, Patna, Kanpur, Puri, Jammu Tawi, etc.

Nearest airports
The nearest airports to Muri Junction are:

Birsa Munda Airport, Ranchi  
Gaya Airport, Gaya 
Lok Nayak Jayaprakash Airport, Patna 
Netaji Subhash Chandra Bose International Airport, Kolkata

See also 

 Ranchi

References

External links 

 Muri Junction Map
 Official website of the Ranchi district

Railway stations in Ranchi district
Ranchi railway division
Railway stations opened in 1907
Railway junction stations in Jharkhand
1907 establishments in India